HMS LST-415 was a United States Navy  that was transferred to the Royal Navy during World War II. As with many of her class, the ship was never named. Instead, she was referred to by her hull designation.

Construction
LST-415 was laid down on 29 October 1942, under Maritime Commission (MARCOM) contract, MC hull 935, by the Bethlehem-Fairfield Shipyard, Baltimore, Maryland; launched 21 November 1942; then transferred to the United Kingdom and commissioned on 19 January 1943.

Service history 
LST-415 saw no active service in the United States Navy.

She was torpedoed at 03:00 by a German E-boat and beached off Thurrock, England, on 16 January 1945.

The tank landing ship was returned to United States Navy custody and struck from the Navy list on 2 June 1945. The ship was sold to a local British firm in January 1948, and subsequently scrapped in Grays, England.

See also 
 List of United States Navy LSTs

Notes 

Citations

Bibliography 

Online resources

External links

 

Ships built in Baltimore
1942 ships
LST-1-class tank landing ships of the Royal Navy
World War II amphibious warfare vessels of the United Kingdom
S3-M2-K2 ships
Maritime incidents in January 1945